Leap in the Dark was a British television anthology series with a supernatural  theme. It was broadcast on BBC 2. It ran for 4 seasons - in 1973, 1975, 1977 and 1980 - consisting of 24 episodes in total. The first-season episodes were documentaries, seasons 2 & 3 were presented by Colin Wilson and consisted of docudramas re-enacting real-life cases of paranormal occurrences, and season 4 was original dramas, including episodes written by Alan Garner, Fay Weldon, and David Rudkin. Apart from the Pilot episode no episode of the first season exists complete due to wiping, and the episode The Battle for Miss Beauchamp, (pronounced 'Bee-cham'), in the 2nd season, is also incomplete.

Episode List

Season 1
 Pilot (9th Jan 1973)
 Untitled (6th Feb 1973) - missing
 A Question of Survival (13th Feb 1973) - missing
 Pendulums and Hazel Twigs (20th Feb 1973) - missing
 Mind Over Matter (27th Feb 1973) - missing
 Hauntings (6th Feb 1973) - missing
 Untitled (20th Mar 1973) - missing

Season 2
 The Rosenheim Poltergeist (19th Sep 1975)
 The Search for Pat MacAdam (26th Sep 1975)
 The Battle for Miss Beauchamp (3rd Oct 1975) - incomplete
 The Vandy Case (10th Oct 1975) Written by Anne Owen

Season 3
 Dream Me a Winner (14th Jan 1977) Written by Colin Godman
 The Fetch (21st Jan 1977) Written by Anne Owen, about the story of Émilie Sagée
 The Ghost of Ardachie Lodge (28th Jan 1977) Written by Colin Godman
 Undercurrents (4th Feb 1977)
 Parlour Games (11th Feb 1977) Written by Anne Owen
 In the Mind's Eye (18th Feb 1977)

Season 4
 Jack Be Nimble (4th Sep 1980) Written by Peter Redgrove
 Watching Me, Watching You (5th Sep 1980) Written by Fay Weldon
 Poor Jenny (8th Sep 1980) Written by Colin Godman
 The Living Grave (9th Sep 1980) Written by David Rudkin
 Come and Find Me (10th Sep 1980) Written by Russell Hoban
 Room for an Inward Light (11th Sep 1980) Written by David Pownall
 To Kill a King (12th Sep 1980) Written by Alan Garner

External links

 Haunted TV
Leap in the Dark Telefantasy list at Internet Archive

1973 British television series debuts
1980 British television series endings
1970s British drama television series
1980s British drama television series
BBC television dramas
1970s British anthology television series
1980s British anthology television series
British supernatural television shows
English-language television shows